Charlene Lee McKenna (born 26 March 1984) is an Irish actress. She became a household name in Ireland after starring as Jennifer Jackson in the miniseries Pure Mule (2005). She appeared on Irish television in Single-Handed 2 (2008), Whistleblower (2008), and Raw (2008–2013). For Raw, she won Best Actress (Television) at the Irish Film & Television Awards, and for Whistleblower, she won Outstanding Actress in a Mini-Series at the Monte Carlo Television Festival.

Since 2009, McKenna has appeared on British television as Rose Erskine in the BBC mystery drama Ripper Street (2012–2016), Leah Liebermann in the BBC psychological thriller Vienna Blood (2019–present), Laura McKee in series five and six of Peaky Blinders (2019–2022), and DS Niamh McGovern in the BBC police procedural Bloodlands (2021–).

Early life and education
McKenna grew up in Glaslough, County Monaghan where her parents owned a mushroom farm and later The Pillar House pub. She has five older brothers. She attended St Louis Secondary School in Monaghan before going on to study Classical Music and Religious Education at Mater Dei Institute of Education in Dublin. However, she deferred her third year to make time for her career before withdrawing from the course altogether.

Career
McKenna first appeared on stage at the age of eleven, playing a small role in Oklahoma! with the Monaghan Youth Theatre. Her first large-scale production was Pure Mule which launched her career. She played Jennifer Jackson, a racy character, in the series. She also appeared in The Old Curiosity Shop, a 2007 ITV adaptation of the Charles Dickens novel of the same name starring Derek Jacobi, Toby Jones, Bradley Walsh, Zoë Wanamaker, Martin Freeman, Steve Pemberton, Anna Madeley and Gina McKee.

In 2007, she appeared in the short Danger High Voltage at the Electric Picnic music festival in Stradbally, County Laois. The film, which also starred Barry Ward and was directed by Luke McManus, went on to win awards at both the Galway Film Fleadh and the Cork Film Festival in 2008. McKenna also appeared as Mary McMahon in Dorothy Mills.

She appeared in the second episode of Single-Handed 2, broadcast on 1 January 2008, in which Garda Sergeant Jack Driscoll investigated the case of the missing two-year-old son of her character, Eilish. Eilish also had to endure several resentful in-laws. This performance was described as "outstanding".

Whistleblower, a two-part fact-based drama broadcast in August 2008, was based on the late 1970s scandal at Our Lady of Lourdes Hospital in Drogheda, County Louth, involving gynaecologist Michael Neary. McKenna played Karen, a young mother who has an unnecessary hysterectomy performed on her after giving birth. Emma Stansfield played the nurse who blew the whistle. McKenna won the Outstanding Actress in a Mini-Series award for her role in Whistleblower at the Monte Carlo Television Festival in June 2009.

McKenna starred in the RTÉ series Raw. Scenes involving restaurant staff tampering with their guests' food failed to attract much complaint. McKenna's character in the series is Jojo, a young chef, working under Tanya, a stressed manager, and a head chef. In the second episode, Jojo organises a party but the alcohol runs out and tensions rise. Raw, a six-part series set in a fictitious restaurant in Dublin, saw McKenna interact with Bachelors Walk actor Keith McErlean and Mistresses actress Shelley Conn. McKenna won the Best Actress (Television) award for her role in Raw at the Irish Film & Television Awards in February 2009. McKenna departed Raw following the Season 5 finale on 10 February 2013.

In 2009, McKenna played the role of Paula Abbot in the second series of The Fixer. In 2010, McKenna portrayed the young version of Josie, the love interest of vampire John Mitchell (Aidan Turner) in BBC supernatural comedy-drama Being Human. In 2011, McKenna appeared in an episode of Channel 4 comedy-drama Sirens. She played the eponymous antagonist "Lamia" in the eighth episode of the fourth season of Merlin. She starred as Seth's dead girlfriend Shannon in Misfits. In 2013, she appeared on Skins Pure as Maddie. Between 2012 and 2016, McKenna appeared as Rose Erskine in BBC mystery drama Ripper Street. In 2015, McKenna played Eva in A.D. The Bible Continues.

In 2019, McKenna appeared in the role of Leah Liebermann in BBC crime drama Vienna Blood. In February 2021, McKenna played a lead role as Detective Sergeant Niamh McGovern in the BBC police procedural drama series, Bloodlands.

Personal life
McKenna announced her engagement to American actor Adam Rothenberg in 2019. They were married in January 2021 at Castle Leslie adjacent to McKenna's hometown. McKenna splits her time between Monaghan, New York, and London.

Filmography

Film

Television

Awards and nominations

References

External links

1984 births
Living people
20th-century Irish people
21st-century Irish people
Irish television actresses
Irish stage actresses
Alumni of Mater Dei Institute of Education
Actresses from County Monaghan